Daniel O'Brien (1683–1759) was an Irish Jacobite soldier and diplomat who served in the Irish Brigade of the French Army during the War of the Spanish Succession, rising to the rank of colonel. He is often referred to as Colonel Daniel O'Brien. He was appointed Earl of Lismore in the Jacobite peerage, a title that was not formally recognised in his native Kingdom of Ireland. His father Murrough O'Brien originally from Carrigogunnell in County Limerick was also one of the Wild Geese, rising to Major General and briefly commanding Clare's Dragoons.

After the Jacobite claimant James Stuart was forced to leave France for Rome due to the terms of the Anglo-French Alliance, he acted as his agent in Paris replacing his fellow countrymen Arthur Dillion in the role and working alongside Francis Sempill and later George Kelly. He also acted as an emissary to the Russian court of Peter the Great in 1718.

In 1745 he signed the Treaty of Fontainebleau which committed France to support the Jacobite Rising that year. From 1747 onwards he was Secretary of State, effectively chief minister to James in his Roman exile. He died in 1759 and was succeeded by his son James Daniel O'Brien (1736–1780) in his Jacobite title.

References

Bibliography
 Massue, Melville Henry. The Jacobite Peerage, Baronetage, Knightage, and Grants of Honour.  Genealogical Publishing, 2003.
 Miller, Peggy. James. George Allen & Unwin, 1971.
 Wills, Rebecca. The Jacobites and Russia, 1715–1750. Dundurn, 2002.

1683 births
1759 deaths
18th-century Irish people
Irish Jacobites
Irish soldiers
Earls in the Jacobite peerage
Irish soldiers in the French Army
Peers created by James II (1689–1701)